Besar Musolli (born 28 February 1989) is a Kosovan professional footballer who plays as a defensive midfielder for Kosovan club Gjilani.

Club career

Youth career and Hysi
In 2005, Musolli began his career in the youth teams of Prishtina, when he was only 16 years old. In 2009, Musolli starts the career as a professional player to Football Superleague of Kosovo side Hysi, where he played for three years.

Kukësi

On 1 July 2012, Musolli completed a transfer to Kategoria Superiore side Kukësi. He made his debut later on 25 August in the club's first ever top flight match against Luftëtari Gjirokastër which ended in a goalless draw.

On 22 May 2016, Musolli played in his second Albanian Cup final match against Laçi and scored the last penalty in the subsequent shoot-out win which secured Kukësi's first ever Albanian Cup trophy.

On 4 August 2016, he agreed a contract extension, signing until June 2017. On 3 January 2018, following the retirement of veteran Rrahman Hallaçi, Musolli was named vice-captain. He made his 150th Kategoria Superiore appearance later on 14 March in the 2–1 away loss to Luftëtari Gjirokastër in the league matchday 25. Five days later, Musolli scored his first-ever league goal for the club in his 200th appearance in all competitions, netting a tap-in in a 2–0 home win over Vllaznia Shkodër. In the post-match interview, when asked about this achievement, Musolli stated: I want to be Francesco Totti of Kukësi.

On 1 August 2018, Musolli played in the 3–0 loss to Qarabağ in the second leg of 2018–19 UEFA Champions League second qualifying round. By doing so, he reached 215 appearances for the club, equaling Rrahman Hallaçi as the player with most appearances for the club. He broke the record in the next match against Torpedo Kutaisi in the first leg of 2018–19 UEFA Europa League third qualifying round.

Musolli suffered a major injury on 15 September during the league match against Teuta Durrës and was replaced at half time. Following the examination, it was confirmed that Musolli has whacked the ligament of his right knee and will remain sidelined for the next six months.

International career
On 5 June 2017, Musolli received his first call-up from Kosovo for the 2018 FIFA World Cup qualification match against Turkey. His debut occurred later on 6 October where he started in another qualifying match against Ukraine.

Personal life
In July 2013, he along with Yll Hoxha were provided with Albanian passport.

Career statistics

Club

International

Honours
Kukësi
Albanian Cup: 2015–16
Albanian Supercup: 2016
Albanian Superliga: 2016–17

References

External links

Besar Musolli at the FSHF

1989 births
Living people
Sportspeople from Podujevo
Kosovan footballers
Kosovo international footballers
Kosovan expatriate footballers
Kosovan expatriate sportspeople in Albania
Association football midfielders
Football Superleague of Kosovo players
KF Hysi players
SC Gjilani players
Kategoria Superiore players
FK Kukësi players